Socialist Democratic Party (SDP) or   was a splinter party of Democratic Action Party (DAP) formed in 1978 by Yeap Ghim Guan was later joined by Fan Yew Teng too after they left DAP because of their disappointment and dispute with the leadership of Lim Kit Siang. SDP failed to win any seat in the Malaysian general election, 1986 and it finally became defunct.

General election results

See also
Politics of Malaysia
List of political parties in Malaysia
Yeap Ghim Guan
Fan Yew Teng

References

External links
 Social Democratic Party Singapore elections

Defunct political parties in Malaysia
1978 establishments in Malaysia
1986 disestablishments in Malaysia
Political parties established in 1978
Political parties disestablished in 1986